The Division of Macnamara is an Australian Electoral Division in the state of Victoria, which was contested for the first time at the 2019 federal election. The division is named in honour of Dame Jean Macnamara, a medical researcher and doctor who specialised in the polio virus and was involved in children's health initiatives.

The current member is Josh Burns of the Australian Labor Party, who has represented the division since the 2019 Australian federal election.

Geography
Since 1984, federal electoral division boundaries in Australia have been determined at redistributions by a redistribution committee appointed by the Australian Electoral Commission. Redistributions occur for the boundaries of divisions in a particular state, and they occur every seven years, or sooner if a state's representation entitlement changes or when divisions of a state are malapportioned.

History
The Division of Macnamara was created in 2018 after the Australian Electoral Commission oversaw a mandatory redistribution of divisions in Victoria. Macnamara is located in most of what was previously the Division of Melbourne Ports, which it replaced in the redistribution. The division is located in Melbourne's south around the eastern shores of Port Phillip Bay and takes in the suburbs of Port Melbourne, Albert Park, Balaclava, Caulfield, Elwood, Middle Park, Ripponlea, Southbank, South Melbourne and St Kilda, as well as parts of Glen Huntly and Elsternwick. It also includes the suburb of Windsor, which had previously been located in the neighbouring division of Higgins.

The seat was notionally held by the Labor Party on a 1.3% margin over the Liberal Party. Its predecessor, Melbourne Ports, had been held by Labor without interruption since 1906, and for over 80 years had been one of Labor's safest seats. However, Labor's hold on the seat became increasingly tenuous after a 1990 redistribution added some wealthier territory around Caulfield. Further analysis identified that the margin between the Labor Party and the Greens had narrowed to less than 0.3% as a result of recent boundary adjustments.

The last member for Melbourne Ports, Michael Danby, opted not to contest the election for the new Macnamara.

The 2022 election in Macnamara was a very close race between Labor's new candidate Josh Burns and the Greens' candidate Steph Hodgins-May. After days of counting, Josh Burns narrowly won the seat, which also narrowly secured Labor a majority in the House of Representatives.

If just another 0.7% of voters had preferenced the Greens above Labor, Steph Hodgins-May would have won Macnamara. The two-party-preferred is not necessarily a useful metric in this instance, as it may give the false impression the seat is held by Labor on a very safe margin, and that the Liberal Party were Labor's primary opponents in the seat.

Demographics 
Macnamara is undergoing rapid inner-city gentrification and contains high-density housing developments. It is notable for its high Jewish population, which has given an edge to Labor in federal elections. The incumbent MP, Josh Burns, is himself the grandson of Jewish migrants who left Europe and settled in Melbourne in search of a safe place to raise their families.

Members

Election results

References

External links
 Division of Macnamara – Australian Electoral Commission

Electoral divisions of Australia
Constituencies established in 2019
2019 establishments in Australia
City of Melbourne
City of Port Phillip
City of Glen Eira
Southbank, Victoria
St Kilda, Victoria
St Kilda East, Victoria
Electoral districts and divisions of Greater Melbourne